Cristián Andrés Arriagada Bižaca (born March 15, 1981) is a Chilean television, theatre and film actor. He is of Croat origin (island of Brač) through his mother's side.

Filmography
 Bang (2006): Joaquín

Miniseries
 La vida es una lotería: "El osito enamorado" (TVN, 2003) – Mauricio
 La vida es una lotería: "Un pedazo de mi suerte" (TVN, 2003) - Camilo

Soap operas
 Buen partido, (Canal 13, 2002) - Martín Márquez
 16, (TVN, 2003) - Ignacio Vargas
 Ídolos (TVN, 2004) - Gabriel Figueroa
 17, (TVN, 2005) - Ignacio Vargas
 Versus, (TVN, 2005) - Octavio Cox
 Amor en tiempo récord, (TVN, 2006) - Íñigo
 Disparejas, (TVN, 2006) - Ricardo
 Floribella, (TVN, 2006) - Federico Fritzenwalden
 Amor por accidente, (TVN, 2007) - Alex Amenábar
 Hijos del Monte, (TVN, 2008) - Pedro Del Monte
 Los Angeles de Estela (TVN) (2009) - Emilio Palacios
 La Familia de al Lado (TVN) (2010) - Leonardo Acosta / Hugo Acosta
 Soltera otra vez (Canal 13, 2012) - Rodrigo
 Verdades Ocultas (Mega (Chile), 2019) Diego Castillo

Theatre
 El método de Grönholm
 Movimiento rápido del ojo
 El diario de un asesor presidencial
 El alma buena de Se-Chuan
 La ópera de tres centavos

External links
 Galerías en TVN
 

1981 births
Living people
Chilean male film actors
Chilean male stage actors
Chilean male telenovela actors
Chilean people of Croatian descent
Chilean people of Basque descent
People from Punta Arenas
ARCIS University alumni